This is a list of episodes for the French animated television series, Code Lyoko. The first season has no set viewing order save for the last two episodes, so it is listed by the order in which it aired. The episodes in the following seasons are numbered in order. The series has a total of ninety-seven episodes: Twenty-six each for the first two seasons, thirteen for the third, thirty for the fourth, and the two-part prequel made alongside the third season. 

The first three seasons, the prequel, and episodes 66–77 and 79–88 aired on Cartoon Network. Episode 78 and episodes 89–95 of the series aired on Cartoon Network Video and Kabillion, instead of on the network channel itself.
The MoonScoop Group announced a sequel series titled Code Lyoko: Evolution which ran for one season and consisted of twenty-six episodes. The series revolves around a gang of boarding school students who travel to the virtual world of Lyoko, within a quantum supercomputer, to battle X.A.N.A., a malevolent AI/multi-agent system who desires to rule all of humanity.

Series overview

Episodes

Season 1 (2003–04) 
In this season only, the spelling of Jeremy's name is officially "Jeremie." It's changed to "Jeremy" in later seasons
Odd Della Robbia's only ability on Lyoko is "future flash", allowing to see imminent danger to his friends or hidden paths. It is used only in four episodes and is lost after this season
The Desert region has the most appearances
Despite not being able to defend herself, Aelita's special ability is her "power of creation", the power to manipulate and alter the terrain of all four ecological regions of the virtual world
Yumi Ishiyama's only power of telekinesis is used in three episodes, as it tires her out in about a minute
Ulrich Stern's Lyoko abilities are "super sprint", "triangulate" and "triplicate"
After many months of hard effort, Aelita is successfully materialized into the real world
The ever-suspicious Jim Morales temporarily joins Team Lyoko, but has his memory wiped by a return to the past

Season 2 (2005–06)
Lyoko's CGI is revamped, making it look a lot brighter than in the first season
The spelling of Jeremy's name is officially changed from "Jeremie" to "Jeremy"
As the Supercomputer was updated, Odd lost his ability to see into the future. In its place, he can project a small, light purple energy shield in front of himself
Jeremy has programmed three flying vehicles for the three Lyoko Warriors: the Overwing for Yumi, the Overbike for Ulrich, and the Overboard for Odd
A fifth Lyoko Sector reveals itself; the central region of the virtual world where all types of data is accessed, including X.A.N.A.'s. The group call it "Sector Five"
Yumi has an additional Tessen fan, further perfecting her accuracy in taking down several of X.A.N.A.'s monsters all at once. She has also started to utilize her telekinetic abilities to perfect their targeting while in flight
The creator of the quantum Supercomputer, Lyoko and X.A.N.A. is revealed to be a former science teacher named Franz Hopper
Aelita is revealed to be the daughter of Franz Hopper and that she had lost her human memories after being virtualized on Lyoko. Her pink-haired mother, who had disappeared, debuts but only in the memories of Aelita's past life as a human
X.A.N.A. finally gains the other half of the Keys to Lyoko from Aelita's subconscious and escapes the Supercomputer

Prequel (2006)
This 44/46-minute two-part special was produced and aired as part of the third season; set a few days before "Teddygozilla"
Jeremy discovers the Supercomputer, turns it on and finds Aelita inside. Having no memory of who she is, Jeremy gives her the name "Maya"
Odd (who was virtualized accidentally in place of Kiwi) and Ulrich are virtualized in the Forest Sector, where Jeremy first discovered Aelita
X.A.N.A.'s very first attack was an electric monster in the shape of an orb
Yumi Ishiyama, mistakenly called "Yuri" by Ulrich, is virtualized in the Ice Sector, where the very first activated tower is
Sissi Delmas is revealed to have known about the Supercomputer and Lyoko, but divulged the information to her father and Jim Morales out of fear of the danger posed by X.A.N.A.
Aelita learns her name upon touching the interface of the activated tower 
Aelita's very first use of her only power of "creativity" was when she instinctively made a wall of solid ice to defend Yumi
Yumi and Odd never discover their abilities of telekinesis and "future flash" nor Ulrich his "super sprint", triplication, and triangulation.

Season 3 (2006) 
Team Lyoko discover the very Heart/Core of Lyoko itself; a huge white sphere with a holographic image of Lyoko in its center, protected by two cube-shaped shields. X.A.N.A. seeks to destroy the Core, provoking the complete destruction of Lyoko and leaving the heroes with no way to fight the evil multi-agent system 
Having become fully human since regaining the memories of her past life on Earth, Aelita can now be rematerialized normally via the scanners. She can fight monsters all on her own by emitting small, pink orbs of energy called "energy fields" from her hands which are capable of destroying a single monster from a distance
To prevent the Lyoko Warriors from reaching Sector 5, X.A.N.A. has his Scyphozoa possess Aelita and uses her to erase the four main Sectors one by one by entering "Code X.A.N.A." in a way tower
William Dunbar is chosen to be the sixth member of the Lyoko Warriors; strengthening their efforts in finishing X.A.N.A. once and for all. Shortly after he is possessed and used to destroy the Heart, wiping out Lyoko
Aelita's long-lost father, Franz Hopper, is revealed to be alive somewhere in the internet, having managed to escape the disintegration of Lyoko

Season 4 (2007) 
The quintet all don new attire on Earth since "Maiden Voyage"
Yumi, Aelita, Odd, and Ulrich don new attire on Lyoko. In addition, their weaponry is slightly upgraded/modified, and respective abilities are somewhat boosted:
Yumi's only ability of telekinesis now enable her to mentally move and hurl several objects all at once, and feels much less exhausted by placing her fingers on the horse pill-shaped things above her eyebrows, now able to use it for longer periods without tiring out. She continues to rarely use it, not even as a specter on Earth, despite the fact that it has gotten a lot stronger. 
Ulrich gets an additional katana, but his "triangulate" ability is never used; his triplicate only in "Double Take" neither are used when he is a specter on Earth.
Odd's purple energy shield has expanded to the point that it covers his legs. As a specter on Earth, it has a pinkish due as seen in its only use in "Down to Earth."
Aelita has white-pink angel wings, which are activated by waving her hand over a star-shaped bracelet, allowing her to fly and carry one other person. Her "creativity" power has strengthened to the point that she can deactivate a sealed door, which Jeremy calls "her digital powers." Her psychic ability of "second sight" is used only in "Kadic Bombshell" to detect X.A.N.A.'s pulsations.  
Having been under X.A.N.A.'s power for quite some time, William is given an ability called "Supersmoke" which is similar to Ulrich's "Supersprint." His larger sword "Zeilwander" can generate an energy discus and he can also levitate, and see what is happening from great distances away.
Additional supercomputers are discovered to be hidden across the globe, each generating a replica of a single sector of Lyoko. Jeremy devises a teleportation method to materialize his friends at the site of these supercomputers on Earth.
Aelita's long-lost mother is revealed to have been abducted by the ominous Men in Black and has not been seen or heard from in four years; her first name is also revealed to be Anthea in "Wrong Exposure."
Franz Hopper himself (whose full name is revealed to be Waldo Franz Schaeffer) finally debuts but as a white energy sphere, as he is incapable of virtualizing himself onto Lyoko in his human form like his daughter. Unfortunately, he ultimately sacrifices himself to enable Jeremy to obliterate X.A.N.A once and for all.
A replica for the Mountain Region is never shown. 
Sissi Delmas learns of their virtual adventures as heroes, prompting a final return to the past, after which the team welcome her as a friend.

See also
List of Code Lyoko media
List of Code Lyoko Evolution episodes

Notes

References 

Code Lyoko
Code Lyoko

zh:至Net奇兵#集名